Pleun Bierbooms (born October 3, 1998) is a Dutch singer who won the 7th season of the Voice of Holland.

Life and career
Bierbooms was born on October 3, 1998, in Lieshout, North Brabant, the Netherlands.

In 2012, Bierbooms won The Voice of Nuenen. She became the winner of The Voice of Holland 2017 on February 17, 2017. Her coach was Waylon. In 2017, Bierbooms was a guest artist during the concerts of the Toppers in the Amsterdam ArenA.

Discography

Singles
 "What's Hurt the Most"
 "One Last Time"
 "The Voice Within"
 "Rise"
 "The Edge of Glory"
 "What Now"
 "Writings on the Wall"
 "I Miss You"

References

External links

The Voice (franchise) winners
1998 births
Living people